Thomas Quick may refer to:

 William Thomas Quick (born 1946), an American conservative blogger, novelist and ghostwriter
 Thomas Rory Quick, apprentice pharmacist in the BBC television series Victorian Pharmacy
 Sture Bergwall (born 1950), also known as Thomas Quick, Swedish psychiatric patient, wrongly convicted of eight murders, later acquitted

See also 
Tom Quick